The Holy Rosary College is a teacher training college for girls located in Enugu, Nigeria.  It was opened on 2 February 1935 by Archbishop Charles Heerey.

Notable alumnae
 Joy Nwosu Lo-Bamijoko, ethnomusicologist, choral conductor, music critic and soprano

See also

 Education in Nigeria
 List of schools in Nigeria

References

1935 establishments in Nigeria
Educational institutions established in 1935
Enugu
Girls' schools in Nigeria
Catholic schools in Nigeria